A recruitment tool is an advertising method that aids in creating interest in and getting people for a typically political organization.  Historically recruitment tools have often taken the form of posters or films, though in modern times recruitment tools have taken the form of advergame video games. Other tools include things like sponsorships of sporting events, or ads on TV.

Film
The following is a list of examples of propaganda film recruitment tools and the political organizations which they intend to recruit for.
Alice's Egg Plant – promotes an anti-union philosophy
The Battleship Potemkin – recruits for the Communist Party of the U.S.S.R.
The Birth of a Nation – recruits for the Ku Klux Klan
The Bond – recruits for the Liberty Load Committee of the U.S. Government
Kolberg – recruits for the Nazi Party
Thirty Seconds over Tokyo – recruits for the U.S. Government
Triumph of the Will – recruits for the Nazi Party
Why We Fight – recruits for the U.S. Government

Video games
The following is a list of examples of video game recruitment tools and the political organization which they intent to recruit for.
America's Army – recruits for the U.S. Army
America's Army: Rise of a Soldier – recruits for the U.S. Army
Ethnic Cleansing – recruits for the Ku Klux Klan and white power skinhead movement
Future Force Company Commander – recruits for the U.S. Army
Marine Expeditionary Unit 2000 – recruits for the United States Marine Corps
PRISM: Guard Shield – recruits for the United States National Guard
Saving the Port – recruits for the Islamic Revolutionary Guard Corps of Iran
Special Force – recruits for Hezbollah
Under Ash – recruits for the Palestine Liberation Organization
Under Siege – recruits for the Palestine Liberation Organization
White Law – recruits for the Ku Klux Klan and Nazi-Skinhead movement
XAN and the Cosmic Callbox – promotes the Montessori method philosophy
ZOG's Nightmare – recruits for the National Socialist Movement

See also
Advergame

Advertising
Propaganda
Recruitment